Passion and Paradise is a 1989 American television crime-drama film directed  by Harvey Hart and starring Armand Assante and Catherine Mary Stewart. For this film Hart won the Gemini Award for Best Direction in a Dramatic Program or Mini-Series. It was based on the book 'Who killed Sir Harry Oakes' written by James Leasor. It was shot  in Jamaica.

Plot

Cast 

 Armand Assante as  	 Alfred de Marigny 
 Catherine Mary Stewart as Nancy
 Rod Steiger as Sir Harry Oakes
 Mariette Hartley as Lady Oakes
 Kevin McCarthy as Harold Christie
 Michael Sarrazin as Mike Vincent
 Andrew Ray as Duke of Windsor
 Linda Griffiths as Duchess of Windsor
 Wayne Rogers as Raymond Schindler
 Johnny Sekka as Alfred Adderly
 Tim Woodward as Godfrey Higgs
 Gwynyth Walsh as Lee Kingsley
 Ron White as Lucky Luciano
  Sam Malkin  as Meyer Lansky

References

External links 

1989 television films
1989 films
Films directed by Harvey Hart
American crime drama films
Canadian drama television films
Canadian crime drama films
English-language Canadian films
American drama television films
1980s American films
1980s Canadian films